Paul Barril (13 April 1946 in Vinay, Isère) is a former officer of the French Gendarmerie Nationale. He authored several books about his military career, touching sensitive political subjects of the Mitterrand era.

Barril was a gendarme until 1995. He was the second officer of the GIGN Special Forces unit for 10 years, before being involved in the creation of the Counterterrorist Cell of the Élysée during François Mitterrand's first mandate from 1981 to 1988. Since then, he has led several private security companies. He has been in the centre of controversies for his role in Africa, particularly in Rwanda during the Rwandan genocide in 1994 during which extremist Hutus mass exterminated hundreds of thousands of ethnic Tutsis and moderate Hutus.

Military career
Barril was second officer of the GIGN from 1974 to 1982, as aid to commandant Christian Prouteau. In late 1979, he was dispatched to Saudi Arabia to help the Saudi government quell the Grand Mosque Seizure, an uprising at Islam's holiest shrine in Mecca that was led by fundamentalist preacher Juhayman al-Otaibi. Barril was interim commander of the GIGN in 1982-1983, while commandant Prouteau was organising the GSPR, a presidential security unit. Barril claims to having "arrested 115 people, being involved in the surrender of 61 madmen, neutralised 17 armed people without using weapons, and freed over 450 hostages."

After a car bomb explosion near a restaurant in Rue Marbeuf in Paris on 22 April 1982, Barril and Prouteau were involved in the creation of the Counterterrorist Cell of the Elysée, along with Prouteau.

Barril was involved in several famous affairs, such as the so-called "Irish of Vincennes" and the Elysée wiretap scandal. Although rumors suggest Paul Barril has been convicted, his police record is clean and shows no signs of conviction.

Private security business
After the "Irishmen from Vincennes" affair, in 1984, Barril created the company Epsylon in Paris.

He also leads a company called SECRETS (for "Société d'Etudes de Conception et de Réalisation d'Equipements Techniques de Sécurité", "Society for Study, Design and Implementation of Technical Security Equipment")  which offers security interventions in foreign countries.

In 1988, Barril organised an "action group" around President Félix Houphouët-Boigny in Côte d'Ivoire.

Rwanda

Barril was involved in Rwanda during the first half of the 90s. He went to Kigali right after the plane ferrying president Juvénal Habyarimana was shot down, as the genocide started. Barril stated that he acted as a councilor to Habyarimana. He was contacted in 1989 for a reorganisation of the Rwandan intelligence services. Other sources refer to an audit of the Rwandan army in 1990.

Barril was also present in Kigali on 7 and 27 April 1994. Rumour has it that after Juvénal Habyarimana was assassinated, his widow, Agathe Habyarimana, hired Barril, via SECRETS company, to investigate the case. Barril declared to journalists of Le Monde and France 2 that he was in possession of the black boxes of the plane and promoted the thesis that the FPR (Rwandan Patriotic Front), led by the Tutsi Paul Kagame, was involved in the attack.

At the same time, on 20 May 1994, Barril was hired by the Hutu temporary government to recover a US$1.65 million payment made for canceled weapon imports.

Notes

Bibliography
 Paul Barril, Missions très spéciales, Presses de la Cité, Paris, 1984.
 Paul Barril, Guerres secrètes à l'Élysée, Albin Michel, Paris, 1996.
 Paul Barril, L'enquête explosive, Flammarion, Paris, 2000.
 Paul Barril, Les archives secrètes de Mitterrand, Albin Michel, Paris, 2001.
 Alison Des Forges, Leave None to Tell the Story: Genocide in Rwanda, New York: Human Rights Watch, 1999, 789 pages. 
 Alison Des Forges Aucun témoin ne doit survivre, Karthala, Paris (version française de l'ouvrage précédent) 
 Patrick de Saint-Exupéry, L'inavouable, la France au Rwanda, Les Arènes, Paris. 
 Laure Coret et François-Xavier Verschave (Sous la direction de), L'horreur qui nous prend au visage - Rapport de la Commission d'enquête citoyenne, édition Karthala, 
 Benjamin Sehene Le Piège Ethnique, Éditions Dagorno, Paris, 1999 
 Yaroslav Trofimov The Siege of Mecca: The Forgotten Uprising in Islam's Holiest Shrine and the Birth of Al Qaeda, (Doubleday, New York, 2007) 

1946 births
Living people
Officers of the National Gendarmerie
French Gendarmerie
People of the Rwandan genocide
People from Isère